The Pskov Judicial Charter was an Old Russian legal code of the Pskov Republic.  It was issued in various redactions between 1397 and 1467, and was based on certain resolutions of the Pskovian city assembly or veche, princely decrees, provisions of the Russkaya Pravda and common law.  It, along with the Novgorod Judicial Charter, was an important source for the Sudebnik of 1497.

The Pskov Judicial Charter reflected the most important aspects of socio-economic and political life of the Pskovian land in the 14th - 15th century. It protected private property, especially feudal landownership, regulated procedures for official registration of landownership and court examination of land disputes, defined the status of the so-called izorniks (a category of feudally dependent peasants). Many articles of the Charter were dedicated to trade relations, such as buying and selling, pawning, loans, hiring of workforce etc. The code provided for a death penalty in case of a political crime or regular criminal offense.

History of creation and enactment 

PDC consist of two parts:

 Chapter by Alexander Mikhailovich, Great Prince of Tver
 Chapter of Konstantin Dmitrievich, Prince, who reign in Pskov at 1407—1414.

It was approved (with further additions) at veche at 1467.

PDC had to determine judicial laws of Prince, posadnik (governor of medieval Russian city-state, appointed by prince or elected by citizens), vicar, church hierarch and other officials. It also established orders of legal proceedings, determinations of crimes, proprietary rights and violences of it, different kinds of obligations and inheritance law.

References

External links
 Full text of the charter in English
 Full text of the charter

See also

 Old Russian Law
 Russkaya Pravda

Legal history of Russia
15th century in Russia
Medieval legal codes
East Slavic manuscripts
Pskov Republic
Cyrillic manuscripts